Events in the year 2008 in South Korea.

Incumbents
 President: 
 Roh Moo-hyun (until February 25), 
 Lee Myung-bak (starting February 25)
 Prime Minister: 
 Han Myeong-sook (until 29 February), 
 Han Seung-soo (starting 29 February)

Events
 2008 Grand National Party Convention bribery incident

January

February
2008 Namdaemun fire broke out on February 10.

March
2008 Asian Wrestling Championships were held in Jeju City from March 18 to 23.

April
2008 Asian Judo Championships were held from April 26 to 27. South Korea had two Gold medalists, six Silver medalists, and 4 Bronze medalists.

May
 24: 2008 US beef protest in South Korea

June

July
52nd Miss Korea 2008 was a beauty pageant. It was held on July 8, 2008 at Sejong Center.

August

South Korea competed in the 2008 Summer Olympics in August. The country had participants that won a total of 31 medals.

September

October

South Korea participated in the 2008 Asian Beach Games, which took place from October 8 to 26.
 October 28: Nonhyeon-dong massacre

November
 15: 2008 Mnet Asian Music Awards

December
 Nayoung Case
 The 23rd Golden Disk Awards were held December 10, 2008. They recognized accomplishments by musicians from the previous year.
 December 13: The first China–Japan–South Korea trilateral summit is held in Fukuoka, Japan.
 December 25: The finalists of the Korean Astronaut Program are selected.

Films

 List of 2008 box office number-one films in South Korea
 29th Blue Dragon Film Awards
 45th Grand Bell Awards

Television

 2008 MBC Drama Awards
 2008 SBS Drama Awards
 2008 KBS Drama Awards
 2nd Korea Drama Awards

Sport
 2008 in South Korean football

See also
2008 in South Korean music
South Korea at the 2008 Summer Paralympics
2008 US beef protest in South Korea
China–Japan–South Korea trilateral summit

References

 
South Korea
South Korea
Years of the 21st century in South Korea
2000s in South Korea